The Atlantean figures are four anthropomorphic statues belonging to the Toltec culture in pre-Columbian Mesoamerica.  These figures are "massive statues of Toltec warriors".  They take their post-Columbian name from the European tradition of similar Atlas or Atalante figures in classical architecture.

Though the most famous Atlantean figures reside in Tula, the Olmecs were the first to use Atlantean figures on a relief discovered in Potrero Nuevo. Mayan sculptors also created "Atlantean" figures in Chichen Itza. Furthermore, the Aztecs also created warrior statues strongly inspired by these Atlantean figures in Tula.

Composition 
The Atlantean figures in Tula are hand-carved statues made from the available stone in the area: limestone, sandstone, and volcanic rock. To carve them, sculptors would have used stone tools, such as chisels for fine sculpting, scrapers of various sizes, and stone hammers. Additional smaller and softer stones were used for smoothing. The process of creating these figures would have been very time-consuming, which is an indication to the importance of these figures to its civilization.

Earliest example of Atlantes in Mesoamerica 

At Potrero Nuevo near San Lorenzo, part of San Lorenzo Tenochtitlán, there is an altar supported by two Atlantean figures created by The Olmecs. It is believed to be the "oldest Mesoamerican example of the themes of atlantes holding up altars or ceilings" The atlantes at this site are also unique compared to those found at other sites.  The atlantes are not carved in the round like they are at later sites, rather they are carved as a relief.

Toltec Atlantean figures from Tula 

Tula has long been considered the capital for the Toltec people. The figures here are depicted as wearing "stylized butterfly breastplates, sun-shaped shields on their backs, feathered headdresses and carry spear throwers and a supply of spears".

Dating 
The exact dates for when Atlantean figures in Tula were carved is unknown. However, rough estimates can be made by dating the sites. The construction of the Toltec empire has been dated to approximately A.D. 750.  This dates mark the earliest time that the figures could have been carved.

Other sites

Mayan Atlantean figures from Chichen Itza 

Built by the Maya people, Chichen Itza is a site located on the northern center of the Yucatan Peninsula and contains what is known as the Temple of Warriors. At the top of the temple, used as support for the roof, run columns of the carved warriors, each wearing a feathered headdress, a butterfly-shaped pectoral, and holding a dart thrower and darts. Like the Atlantean figures in Tula, the figures from Chichen Itza have not been dated exactly. The construction of Chichen Itza took place between A.D.100-250.

Aztec Atlantean figures from Tenochtitlan 
Aztec sculptors built warrior sculptures with great resemblance to those created by the Toltecs. The Aztecs created some of these warrior statues in a group of five that resided in the Aztec capital. This group contained four male statues and one female statue. One bearded male warrior originally stood in the center of the group, while one male soldier stood North, East and South. The fifth sculpture, a female warrior, stood West. These warriors marked the center and four directions of the universe, and were meant to guard the sun.

The Aztec Atlantean figures have characteristics of a warrior. They hold spears and have clay nose bars which indicate military prowess. Like a Tula Atlantean figure, the typical Aztec Atlantean figure has a butterfly symbol on his chest. However, the typical Atlantean Aztec figure also has the butterfly symbol on his head.   Aztec Atlantean figures are currently displayed at the National Museum of Anthropology in Mexico City.

Toltec influence 
Tula, the ancient Toltec capital, collapsed in the 12th century, before the Aztecs established their own city-states. The Aztec people originally migrated from Aztlan across the central highlands before they reached the valley of Mexico, where they established Tenochtitlan. During their migration, they passed through the ruins of Tula.

The Aztecs regarded their predecessors, the Toltecs, as great warriors. The Toltecs conquered nearby peoples and then were paid tribute at Tula. Similar to the Toltecs, the Aztecs utilized tribute-towns to pay maize and other goods to Tenochtitlan. Toltecayotl, which translates in Nahuatl to "to have a Toltec heart", was a term that indicated greatness, displaying the Aztecs' reverence of the Toltecs. According to Richard Townsend,"[Toltecayotl] was to excel, to be worthy, to possess extraordinary qualities in the manner of the ancients."Therefore, by imitating Toltec Atlantean figures, the Aztecs associated themselves with the fearless warriors of an ancient nation regarded as great and powerful. The Atlantean figures of Tenochtitlan were not the only sculptures that showed resemblance to the sculpture of Tula. Aztec standard-bearer statues, seating figures with flagpoles, are very similar to those found in Tula. Furthermore, the Aztecs created chacmools, reclining figures used for rituals, based on those that they encountered in Tula.

Continuity or disjunction? 
Richard Townsend has said that "the Aztecs drew on ancient artistic themes to associate themselves with the great traditions of Mesoamerican antiquary." In "State and Cosmos in the Art of Tenochtitlan", Townsend explores whether Aztec sculpture maintains continuity with or diverges from sculpture of the past. Townsend:

"The Mexica formed an art that would help to integrate their realm ideologically, and that would simultaneously serve to affirm the Mexica as legitimate successors to the great nations of the past."
Townsend explores the dichotomy between continuity and disjunction by comparing Aztec warrior figures to Toltec Atlantean figures. He argues the some Aztecs figures possess characteristics especially similar to those of the Atlanteans from Tula. For example, he identifies one figure whose body is more contained within a planar, monolithic space. The expression is less defined and the carved lines are less vivid. According to Townsend, this figure displays continuity. Townsend then observes another Aztec Atlantean figure that to him represents disjunction. The figure shows influence of more common Mexica style. Townsend points out greater detail, bold lines, deeper relief, and swelling of the face. By looking closely at specific Aztec Atlantean figures, Townsend proves that the Aztecs imitated Toltec Atlantean figures but also integrated their own style and traditions.

Significance

Political 
There is indication that Atlantean figures "express the rise of new kind of military order and associated types of behaviour ".  Between A.D. 850 and A.D. 900, archaeological evidence in the form of an increased number of emblems found throughout Mesoamerica support the idea that there was a "shift in leadership from the traditional one of paramount lord supported by lesser nobles (reflected in the radial stable networks and outlying elite complexes) to one that recast these supporting groups in the form of military orders". Mesoamerican Atlantean figures are seen to be the representation of this shift in political thinking.

See also 
 Caryatid
 Maya stelae

References 

History of sculpture
Mesoamerican archaeology
Mesoamerican stone sculpture
Rock art in North America
Columns and entablature